Ian Pieris (14 March 1933 – 1 January 2016) was a Sri Lankan first-class cricketer and a former president of Sri Lanka Cricket.

Education
Pieris was educated at S. Thomas' College, Mount Lavinia and then read economics at Queens' College, Cambridge, matriculating in 1955. Whilst in Cambridge he played cricket for the Cambridge University Cricket Club.

References

External links
 

1933 births
2016 deaths
Sri Lankan cricketers
Cambridge University cricketers
Cricketers from Colombo
Alumni of Queens' College, Cambridge